The 2019 International Gymnix competition was the 28th edition of the International Gymnix competition.  It was held in Montreal, Canada from March 7–10, 2019.

Medal table

Medal winners

References

External links
  Official site

International Gymnix
2019 in Canadian sports
2019 in Quebec